Peter Talbot (March 30, 1854 – December 6, 1919) was a Canadian teacher, parliamentarian and Senator.

Early life 
Peter Talbot was born in Eramosa, Canada West (now Ontario) on March 30, 1854 to Henry Talbot and Margaret Stewart. He was educated at Rockwood Academy and later Ottawa Normal School (eventually became part of University of Ottawa), where he received his teacher's first-class certificate. Talbot married Clara Card on January 1, 1879. He moved to Fort Macleod, North-West Territories (NWT), in 1890 to teach school. In 1892, he moved to Lacombe, to homestead and raise cattle. His son, Percy Russell Talbot, was the first Chief Veterinary Inspector for Alberta.

Political life 
In 1902 he was elected to the Legislative Assembly of Northwest Territories for Lacombe and served until 1904 as a supporter of the Frederick W. A. G. Haultain government.

In 1904, he was elected to the House of Commons of Canada for the riding of Strathcona as a Liberal. As a Member of Parliament, Talbot was a key figure in Alberta's entrance in Canadian Confederation as a province, advising Laurier on matters, along with Edmonton Liberal Member of Parliament Frank Oliver. Both men were instrumental in assuring Laurier the draft electoral districts for the province were fairly aligned after repeated calls of gerrymandering by southern Albertans. Talbot promoted both Edmonton and Strathcona as the seat of government for the new province of Alberta, going so far to say he would "fight to the finish".

Historian Lewis Thomas argues that Talbot could have been named Alberta's first Premier if he had desired the position. Talbot instead sought a position in the Senate and admitted in letters he did not have the stamina to continue in elected politics, nor the financial resources. Talbot instead recommended Frank Oliver as the first Premier, and after he declined, he recommended Strathcona's NWT Council man Alexander Cameron Rutherford to Laurier, who accepted the proposal. Prior to being named to the Senate, Talbot wrote Rutherford asking that the position of Sheriff of Red Deer be set aside for him.

In 1906, he was appointed to the Senate on the advice of Wilfrid Laurier, representing the senatorial division of the province of Alberta (created 1905 from the North-West Territories).

Talbot was reported ill in December 1919, and died on December 6, 1919 in Lacombe at the age of 65, while serving in the Senate.

References 

Works cited

External links 

1854 births
1919 deaths
Canadian senators from Alberta
Liberal Party of Canada MPs
Liberal Party of Canada senators
Members of the House of Commons of Canada from Alberta
Members of the Legislative Assembly of the Northwest Territories
People from Wellington County, Ontario
Members of the House of Commons of Canada from the Northwest Territories